Brachysporium is a genus of anamorphic fungi in the family Trichosphaeriaceae. It has 25 species. The genus was circumscribed in 1886 by Pier Andrea Saccardo, with Brachysporium obovatum assigned as the type species. The genus Cryptadelphia, circumscribed in 2004 to contain six presumed teleomorphs of Brachysporium, has since been placed in synonymy with Brachysporium.

Species

Brachysporium abietinum 
Brachysporium bloxamii 
Brachysporium breve 
Brachysporium britannicum 
Brachysporium citrulli 
Brachysporium cynodontis 
Brachysporium dingleyae 
Brachysporium fusiforme 
Brachysporium graminis 
Brachysporium helgolandicum 
Brachysporium masonii 
Brachysporium minutum 
Brachysporium nigrum 
Brachysporium noblesiae 
Brachysporium novae-zelandiae 
Brachysporium obovatum 
Brachysporium oosporum 
Brachysporium oryzae 
Brachysporium pendulisporum 
Brachysporium pini-insularis 
Brachysporium polyseptatum 
Brachysporium pulchrum 
Brachysporium syagri 
Brachysporium warneckeanum

References

Trichosphaeriales
Sordariomycetes genera
Taxa described in 1886
Taxa named by Pier Andrea Saccardo